The 2003 Africa Cup second division was the second  edition of lower level rugby union tournament in Africa. The teams were divided in two zones, with a final between the winner of each zone.

South Zone 

In the South Zone, played in Lusaka, four teams were involved. Uganda played with the second team, after the promotion of first team in the first division.

Semifinals

Finals 
 Third place

  First place

North Zone 

Played in Bamako, with eight teams divided in two pools of four.

Pool 1

Pool 2

Finals 

 Seventh place final

 Fifth place final

 Third place final

 First place final

Final 

The final of the tournament, between the winner of each zone, was played in Chingola, Zambia and was won by Cameroon.

See also 
 2003 Africa Cup

References and notes 

2003
2003 rugby union tournaments for national teams
2003 in African rugby union